Agnen: A Journey Through the Dark is Keep of Kalessin's second album.

Avantgarde Music, the record label, mixed the running order of the tracks 1, 4 and 6 on the album (the rest is correct). There are two different versions of this album, with different running orders. The first edition has track 1 Pain Humanised, track 4 Dryland and track 6 Dragonlord. The second edition (this version is as the band intended it) has track 1 Dryland, track 4 Dragonlord and track 6 Pain Humanised.

Both of these are different from what it says on the back of the CD-case. On the back of the CD-case, the running order is as the track listing shows below.

Track listing

Credits
Arnt "Obsidian C." Grønbech – guitars, synths
Ghâsh – Vocals
Warach (Øyvind A.Winther) – Bass
Vegar "Vyl" Larsen – drums

External links
 Encyclopaedia Metallum
 Keep of Kalessin at MySpace

1999 albums
Self-released albums
Keep of Kalessin albums